United States v. Gementera, 379 F.3d 596 (9th Cir. 2004), was a case decided by the 9th Circuit that held that a judge had the statutory authority to impose a sentence for mail theft that involved public reintegrative shaming because the punishment was reasonably related to the statutory objective of rehabilitation.  The punishment required that the thief wear a sandwich board sign stating, "I stole mail; this is my punishment", while standing for eight hours outside of a San Francisco postal facility.

References

External links

United States Court of Appeals for the Ninth Circuit cases
United States sentencing case law
2004 in United States case law